Juan Carlos López Martínez (born March 12, 1989 in Querétaro City, Querétaro) is a former professional Mexican footballer who last played for Zacatepec.

References

External links
Juan López at Ascenso MX Profile
Juan López at Soccerway

Living people
Mexican footballers
1989 births
People from Querétaro City
Association football midfielders
Querétaro F.C. footballers
Club Atlético Zacatepec players
Coras de Nayarit F.C. footballers
Alebrijes de Oaxaca players